Strømme is a neighborhood in the city of Kristiansand in Vest-Agder county, Norway. It is a part of the Oddernes borough and the district of Søm.  It is located next to the Rona and Strømsdalen neighborhoods.

References

Geography of Kristiansand